Crooked Tree is a settlement located in the nation of Belize. It is a mainland village located in the Belize District.

External links

Populated places in Belize District
Belize Rural North